Pigeon Island National Park is one of the two marine national parks of Sri Lanka. The national park is situated 1 km off the coast of Nilaveli, a coastal town in Eastern Province, encompassing a total area of 471.429 hectares. The island's name derives from the rock pigeon which has colonized it. The national park contains some of the best remaining coral reefs of Sri Lanka. Pigeon Island was designated as a sanctuary in 1963. In 2003 it was re-designated as a national park. This national park is the 17th in Sri Lanka. The island was used as a shooting range during the colonial era. Pigeon Island is one of the several protected areas affected by the Indian Ocean tsunami in 2004.

Physical features 
Pigeon Island consists of two islands; large pigeon island and small pigeon island. The large pigeon island is fringed by a coral reef, and is about 200 m long and 100 m wide. Its highest point is 44.8 m above mean sea level. The small pigeon island is surrounded by rocky islets. The national park is situated within the dry zone of Sri Lanka. The annual  rainfall ranges between  while most of the rain is received during the North-eastern monsoon season from October to March.

Flora and fauna 
The large pigeon island's coral reef fauna is dominated by Acropora spp. with some Montipora spp. Faviidae, Mussidae and Poritidae species dominate the coral reef around the rocky islets. Areas with soft corals such as Sinularia, Lobophyton, and Sarcophyton can also be observed. The coral reef harbors many vertebrates and invertebrates. Many of the 100 species of corals and 300 coral reef fishes recorded around the Trincomalee area are found in the national park. Juvenile and adult blacktip reef shark are seen around the shallow coral areas. Hawksbill turtle, green turtle and olive ridley are the visiting sea turtles of the coral reef. The island is important breeding ground for the rock pigeon.

Conservation 
Fishing and ornamental fish collection are the main economic usages of the coral reef. The pigeon island is also used as a scuba diving site. Uncontrolled tourism has resulted in reef degradation and loss of biodiversity and fish density. Scientific research was hindered due to the civil war in the past two decades. A proposed pier between the mainland coast and the island has attracted criticism.

See also 
 Protected areas of Sri Lanka

References 

Landforms of Eastern Province, Sri Lanka
National parks of Sri Lanka
Protected areas established in 2003
Protected areas in Eastern Province, Sri Lanka
Uninhabited islands of Sri Lanka